Kim Sun-yong and Chu-Huan Yi won the title by defeating Thiemo de Bakker and Donald Young 6–3, 6–4 in the final.

Seeds

Draw

Finals

Top half

Bottom half

Sources
Draw

Boys' Doubles
2005 Boys' Doubles